Garrison Township is an inactive township in Christian County, Missouri. A post office with the same name was established in 1887, named after a family of Garrisons. A school with the same name had its name transferred from either the township or the post office.

References

Townships in Missouri
Townships in Christian County, Missouri